Darrell Clayton Hammond (born October 8, 1955) is an American actor, stand-up comedian, annnouncer, and impressionist. Hammond was a regular cast member on the NBC sketch comedy series Saturday Night Live from 1995 to 2009, and has been its announcer since 2014.

Upon his departure from the cast in 2009, Hammond, at age 53, was the oldest cast member in the show's history. He has made more SNL appearances than any other cast member and impersonated more than 107 celebrities, with Bill Clinton as his most frequent impression.

On September 19, 2014, Hammond was announced as the new announcer of SNL, replacing Don Pardo, who had died the month before.

Early life
Hammond was born in Melbourne, Florida, the son of Margaret and Max Hammond. Hammond was severely abused by his mother, contributing to his lifelong struggles with depression and substance abuse. Hammond's father, dealing with his own psychological issues resulting from his military service during World War II, often drank heavily and acted out violently. Hammond found as a child that doing impressions was the only thing he did his mother liked.
 
He played baseball in high school and at Brevard Community College. In high school, he was a teammate of future San Diego Padres and San Francisco Giants manager Bruce Bochy. He went on to attend the University of Florida, where he graduated in 1978 with a degree in advertising and a 2.1 GPA. He credits UF theater professor David Shelton for encouraging his work. After completing college, Hammond moved to New York City where he worked as a waiter, studied at HB Studio, played roles in theater productions, and performed one set at a comedy club at age 26. Hammond then returned to Florida where he was a radio DJ at BJ 105 FM, telling Howard Stern in 2002, "First I tried to be a jock, which I really sucked at," followed by being a voiceover artist in the Orlando area.

Career

Saturday Night Live
At 32 years old, Hammond moved back to New York to make one last attempt at being a stand-up comedian. After seven years and two failed Saturday Night Live auditions, he was spotted in 1995 by an SNL producer while doing a Bill Clinton impression - shortly after Phil Hartman, who had been doing the impression, left the show. After an exclusive audition for creator and executive producer Lorne Micheals, Hammond was brought on board as a cast member and performed for 14 seasons. He previously held the record for the longest consecutive tenure of any SNL cast member in the show's history, until he was surpassed by Kenan Thompson in 2017.

He also holds SNL records for the second most impressions by a single cast member (107, as of the Zac Efron/Yeah Yeah Yeahs episode), beat only by Thompson, and also for the most times saying the show's catchphrase "Live from New York, it's Saturday Night!" to start the show (76 times, beating out Dana Carvey).

He is best known on the show for not only his impersonations of Bill Clinton, but also Al Gore, Donald Trump, John McCain, Regis Philbin, Dick Cheney, Chris Matthews, Phil Donahue, Phil McGraw, Ted Koppel, John Travolta, Jesse Jackson, Geraldo Rivera, Dan Rather, and Sean Connery, in the recurring "Celebrity Jeopardy!" skits. His impression of Clinton is currently the most frequent SNL impression of all time, appearing in 87 sketches over 14 years in the cast and numerous cameos. Hammond also impersonated SNL announcer Don Pardo, filling in for Pardo on occasions when the announcer was unavailable.

After the end of the 34th season, Hammond retired from the show after a record-breaking 14 years as a repertory player. Hammond was the last SNL cast member from the 1990s to leave the show. After leaving the show, he has made multiple cameo appearances.

In 2014 Hammond took over the announcer role on SNL starting with the 40th-season premiere, replacing Pardo, who had died that August. Since he began as announcer, he has also appeared in skits numerous times reprising his Clinton and Trump impersonations.

The following season Hammond reappeared on the show, doing his impression of Trump just as the real Trump began performing well in the Republican primaries. Hammond moved back to New York in 2016 after Trump won the nomination, expecting to be appearing on a weekly basis during the election. However, SNL producer Lorne Michaels decided instead to go with Alec Baldwin's impression, believing that it more effectively captured the contemporary Trump.

Other work
In the late 1980s, Hammond gained fame for his impersonations of Elmer Fudd and other Looney Tunes characters in the comedy single "Wappin'." The song was popular enough with Dr. Demento listeners to be included on the show's 20th-anniversary compilation.

Hammond is a frequent guest on The Howard Stern Show. He has also guest-starred in episodes of Law & Order: Special Victims Unit and Law & Order: Criminal Intent;. He had his own stand-up comedy special on Comedy Central: Comedy Central Presents Darrell Hammond. Hammond can frequently be seen at The Comedy Cellar in New York City.

In the summer of 2007, Hammond made his Broadway theatre debut, playing the role of Vice Principal Douglas Panch in The 25th Annual Putnam County Spelling Bee. In 2009, Hammond had a guest starring role on the FX drama Damages. The same summer, Hammond appeared with Eli Manning, Peyton Manning, and Donald Trump in an Oreo commercial, where he does an impression of Trump.

Beginning in May 2015, Hammond began playing the role of fast-food mascot Colonel Sanders in an ad campaign for KFC, until Norm Macdonald replaced him on August 17, 2015.

Since returning to Los Angeles in 2017, Hammond has appeared in episodes of Criminal Minds, At Home with Amy Sedaris, and a Friday Night Lights spoof series on sports website The Kicker.

Personal life
Hammond married his wife, Elizabeth, on May 9, 1990. The couple divorced in the early 1990s, then remarried in 1997. They have a daughter together, Mia (born 1998). Hammond was seen with another woman several times in May and June 2011, prompting speculation about their marriage. During a 2012 appearance on the Imus in the Morning radio program, Hammond revealed that the couple was in the process of divorcing, and shortly later that same year the divorce became final.

Hammond has admitted to struggling with alcoholism and cocaine addiction. The death of a close friend in 1991 led to a relapse of drug and alcohol abuse. Hammond regularly wears all black when not performing as an homage to another friend who committed suicide in 1992. After another relapse in 2009, Hammond went to rehab.

In August 2011, Hammond filed a lawsuit against Jose Mendez and Dona Monteleone after a car accident in which he was the passenger. Monteleone, who was driving Hammond's vehicle at the time of the accident, is a Manhattan real estate agent.

During an October 2011 interview with CNN, Hammond revealed that his mother had abused him during his childhood. His anxiety from abuse led to cutting, several hospitalizations due to psychiatric issues, and diagnoses which initially included bipolar disorder, schizophrenia, and borderline personality disorder.

Hammond says that he was medicated throughout his tenure on Saturday Night Live, and that he cut himself backstage and was once taken from the studio to a psychiatric ward. The incident helped him come to terms with what he and the doctor who treated him realized was his fundamental issue, the posttraumatic stress disorder stemmed from his abusive childhood. Just prior to his 2000 appearance as Al Gore in a sketch parodying that year's first presidential debate, he had a panic attack due to forgetting his lines. However, he gave a performance so effective that Gore's campaign staff made him watch it to understand why he had aroused negative reactions in some viewers.

HarperCollins published Hammond's memoir, God, If You're Not Up There, I'm F*cked, in 2011. It is an account of his abusive childhood, psychiatric issues, struggles with substance abuse, and experiences on Saturday Night Live. In 2015 he adapted it into a one-man play starring himself, directed by Christopher Ashley, which debuted in San Diego, California, at La Jolla Playhouse to positive reviews. The director has expressed plans for a Broadway residency, although Hammond stated he would prefer an actor to play him instead, as he found the tour so stressful he had to be hospitalized twice during the Los Angeles run.

In 2015 Hammond revived his Trump impression on SNL, after Taran Killam's attempt failed to gain public interest. The following year he returned to New York after five years, expecting that with Trump having received the Republican presidential nomination that year, he would be appearing on the show more in the fall. When Alec Baldwin replaced him, he fell into a deep depression and was prescribed Antabuse and a beta blocker to prevent a relapse of his addiction issues. Hammond and his girlfriend eventually moved back to Los Angeles, where reminders of Baldwin's Trump impression were less advertised.

Entrapment incident
In the late 1980s, Hammond said that he worked briefly as a stand-up comedian on Premier Cruise Line ships. One evening, while the ship was docked in the Bahamas, Hammond says he visited a restaurant, where he consumed the equivalent of 16 shots of rum. He claimed that a man repeatedly asked him throughout the evening to take a dollar bill with trace amounts of cocaine on it. When he left the bar to use the restroom, the man followed him into the stall and told him, "I think you should take this with you." Believing he was about to be mugged, he relented, and the man placed the bill inside Hammond's pocket. Local police were waiting outside the restroom and quickly arrested him. According to Hammond, the United States Drug Enforcement Administration later told him that the episode had been a setup, and that local authorities regularly entrap American tourists; he spent a weekend in jail. Hammond was released after his father traveled to the Bahamas and paid $3,000 for his son's release.

Hammond first publicly mentioned his incarceration in the Bahamas as a guest on a 1998 episode of the radio show Loveline; and again when he returned to Loveline in 2000 and 2004, as well as during an appearance on the Opie & Anthony show in 2012.

Filmography

Film

Television

References

External links

Darrell Hammond: 12 years on SNL 

1955 births
20th-century American comedians
21st-century American comedians
20th-century American male actors
21st-century American male actors
American impressionists (entertainers)
American male comedians
American male film actors
American male television actors
American sketch comedians
American stand-up comedians
Eastern Florida State College people
Living people
Male actors from Florida
Melbourne High School alumni
People from Melbourne, Florida
People with bipolar disorder
People with borderline personality disorder
People with schizophrenia
People with post-traumatic stress disorder
University of Florida alumni